Eleanor Painter Strong (September 12, 1885 – November 3, 1947), was an American opera singer.

Biography
Strong was born in Waterville, Iowa as Eleanor Painter on September 12, 1885 to Mary Ellen and John Painter.

She grew up in Colorado and later moved to Manhattan in New York City to pursue a singing career.

In 1912, she studied singing in Berlin, Germany and debuted at Covent Garden in London the following year.  She sang for five seasons with the Charlottenburg Opera in Berlin and, between seasons in 1914, starred in The Lilac Domino in New York City.  Composer Victor Herbert wrote the operetta The Princess Pat for her.

Starting in 1914 she played in dramatic productions as well as musicals and operas.  Her operatic repertory included Madame Butterfly and Carmen, in New York City, Philadelphia, Pennsylvania, and Berlin. While in New York, she gave solo recitals accompanied by pianist Alice Marion Shaw.

She married Wilfred Douthitt, aka Louis Graveure, a musician (baritone), around 1916.

In 1931 she married Major Charles Henry Strong, a businessman from Cleveland, Ohio and settled there with him.

Strong died on November 3, 1947 in Cleveland, Ohio.

References

External links

portrait(New York Public Library, Billy Rose collection)

American operatic sopranos
1880s births
1947 deaths
Musicians from Cleveland
Singers from Iowa
20th-century American women opera singers
Classical musicians from Ohio
Classical musicians from Iowa
Classical musicians from Colorado
Singers from Ohio
Singers from Colorado